Ayen Ho (Chinese 何璟昕, He Jingxin ) is a Chinese C-pop (Cantopop and Mandopop) singer-songwriter born in Qingyuan, Guangdong province. Ho has released songs and albums in mandarin and Cantonese and she is considered one of the pioneers of mainland-Chinese Cantopop wave. She currently lives in Beijing.

Early life 
Ayen Ho was born 6 March 1994 in Qingyuan. She moved with her family to Huizhou, Guangdong Province, where she lived during her school years.

In 2012, Ho moved to Beijing and applied to study in the digital media and arts department of the North China Technologic University. During that time, she started learning to play guitar, ukelele and violoncello. A year later, she won a music contest organised by the same institution, which meant the start of her music career.

Career 
In 2014, Ho released her first Mandarin EP entitled Phototrophism. She released more original songs and performed in many song contests in cities such as Beijing, Shanghai and Shenzhen. After graduating from university two years later, Ho went on with her music career organising a tour around 16 Chinese cities. In 2016, she was nominated to the Abilu Music awards for a song entitled "The right time".

In 2017, Ho composed music for TV commercials for companies such as Chevrolet, Pacific Insurance Company and also took part in a music event organised by Netease Cloud Music. In 2018, she registered herself in the Quangzhou Normal University in Xiamen, where she studied a master in music composition. At the end of that year, she took part in an exposition of musical instruments in Shanghai where she performed some of her songs.

In 2019, Ho released her first full-length Cantonese album entitled Maybe today.

Discography

Studio albums 

 Phototrophism (2016)
 Maybe today (2019)

Singles 

 "Shooting star" (2016)
 "An afternoon" (2016)
 "Cloudy landscape" (2017)
 "One play, one dream" (2019)
 "Moonlight" (2019)
 "Obsessed guy" (2019)
 "Kite" (2019)
 "Await one thing everyday" (2019)

References

External links 

 Ayen Ho Weibo profile.
 Ayen Ho QQ profile.

C-pop singers
Mandopop musicians
Cantopop singer-songwriters
Mandopop singer-songwriters
1994 births
Living people
21st-century Chinese women singers